Murray Brown (born 9 November 1946) is a New Zealand cricketer. He played in five first-class matches for Central Districts from 1973 to 1975.

With fellow Central Districts and Manawatū player Alec Astle, Brown wrote 125 Not Out, the official history of the Manawatū Cricket Association, in 2021.

See also
 List of Central Districts representative cricketers

References

External links
 

1946 births
Living people
New Zealand cricketers
Central Districts cricketers
People from Inglewood, New Zealand